Breaking Horizons is a 2012 German drama film directed by Pola Schirin Beck.

Cast 
 Aylin Tezel as Lara
 Henrike von Kuick as Nora
 Tómas Lemarquis as Elvar
 Godehard Giese as Martin

External links 

German drama films
2012 drama films
2012 films
2010s German films